The Afghan Transitional Administration was established in June and July 2002. It has been replaced with the election of a permanent government in 2004.

President and chairman 
Hamid Karzai

Vice presidents
Hedayat Arsala
Mohammad Qasim Fahim
Abdul Karim Khalili
Nematullah Shahrani

Security advisors
Yunus Qanuni
Zalmay Rassoul

Ministers
Sayed Hussein Anwari (Agriculture)
Mir Wais Saddiq (Son of Ismail Khan) (Air Transport/Tourism)
Arif Nurzai (Border Affairs)
Sayed Mustafa Kazemi (Commerce)
Masum Stanakzai (Communication)
Mohammad Qasim Fahim (Defense)
Abdul Rashid Dostum (Deputy Defense)
Muhammad Yunus Qanuni (Education)
Yusuf Nooristani (Environment) (U.S. citizen)
Ashraf Ghani Ahmadzai (Finance) (U.S. citizen)
Abdullah (Foreign Affairs)
Mohammad Amin Naziryar (Hajj and Waqf)
Dr. Soheila Siddiqi (Health)
Sharif Fayez (Higher Education) (U.S. citizen)
Sayed Makhdoom Raheen (Information/Culture) (Raheen is a U.S. citizen)
Ali Ahmad Jalali (Interior) (since Jan. 2003) (U.S. citizen)
Ahmed Yusuf Nuristani (Irrigation/Environment)
Abdul Rahim Karimi (Justice)
Noor Mohammad Qarqin (Labor/Social Affairs)
Mohammad Alim Razm (Light Industries)
Abdullah Wardak (Martyrs and Disabled)
Juma Muhammad Muhammadi (Mines and Industries) (died in plane crash, February 24, 2003)
Mohammad Mohaqeq (Planning)
Mohammad Amin Farhang (Reconstruction) (German citizen)
Inayatulah Nazeri (Refugees)
Hanif Atmar (Rural Development)
Said Mohammad Ali Jawid (Transportation)
Yusuf Pashtun until August 16, 2003 (Urban Planning)
Ahmed Shaker Kargar (Water and Electricity)
Habiba Sarobi (Women's Affairs)
Mahbooba Hoquqmal (State or Advisor-Minister for Women's Affairs)
Gul Agha Sherzai after August 16, 2003 (Urban Affairs)

Head of Supreme Court
Fazl Hadi Shinwari

Governors
Ghazni province: Qari Baba
Herat province: Ismail Khan until August 13, 2003
Kabul province: Taj Mohammad Mujaahid
Kandahar province: Gul Agha Sherzai until August 16, 2003; then Yusuf Pashtun
Khost province: Hakim Taniwal (appointed by Karzai in April 2002)
Kunar province: Sayyid Yusuf
Nangarhar province: Gul Agha Sherzai replacing Hajji Din Muhammad (brother of late Hajji Qadir)
Nimruz province: Abdul Karim Brahoui
Paktia province: Taj Mohammad Wardak (appointed by Karzai in mid-February 2002)
Zabul province: Hamidullah Tokhi until August, 2003; then Hafizullah Khan
Anwar ul-Haq Ahadi (governor of the Afghan Central Bank)

Jawzjan  Sayeed Ahmad Shah

Afghan ambassadors and envoys
To Australia: Mahmoud Saikal
To Canada: Omar Samad, was Jalil Jamili
To People's Republic of China: Rahi Barlas
To Egypt: Abdul Ghafar Karzai
To France: Dr. Zalmai Haquani
To Germany: Hamidullah Nasir Zia
To India: Massoud Khalili
To Iran: Dr. Ahmad Moshahed
To Italy: Mostapha Zair
To Japan: Anwar Akbari
To Pakistan: Nangyalai Tarzi
To Russia: Ahmad Zia Massoud (Brother of Ahmad Shah Massoud)
To Saudi Arabia: Anwar Neko
To Tajikistan: Mohammad Dawod Panjshiri
To Turkmenistan: Mohammad Nazir Qasimi
To United Arab Emirates: Mr. Rashuddin
To United Kingdom: Ahmad Wali Massoud
To United Nations New York City: Dr. Rawan Farhadi
To United Nations Geneva: Shams Ul-Zakir Kazimi
To United States: Ishaq Shahryar; Chargé d' Affaires: Haroun Amin
To Uzbekistan: Abdul Samad

Foreign ambassadors and chargés d'affaires in Kabul
People's Republic of China: Sun Yuxi
European Union: Francesc Vendrell
Germany: Rainer Eberle
Pakistan: Rustam Shah Mohmand
Saudi Arabia: Abdullah Fahd al-Kahlani
Switzerland: Christian Dunant (in Islamabad)
United Nations: Lakhdar Brahimi
United States: Robert Finn

2000s in Afghanistan
Transitional